The Intercounty Baseball League (IBL) is a Canadian amateur baseball league, comprising teams of college players and former professionals from North America and beyond. The teams are located in Southern Ontario.

The league was formed in 1919 and has enjoyed much success over its long history. Teams are run similar to a professional minor-league team, providing players an opportunity to play under the same conditions, using wooden bats and minor-league specification baseballs. Teams play 42 scheduled games from early May to late-August. The playoffs are best-of-five series with the championship series typically played around Labour Day. The most recent champions are the London Majors who defeated the Toronto Maple Leafs 4-2 in the 2022 Dominico Cup Final

History

The Intercounty Baseball League (IBL) was founded in 1919 with just four cities represented — Galt, Guelph, Stratford and Kitchener, and is the oldest amateur men's league in Canada. During the early years, the league expanded to include the cities of Waterloo, Brantford, Preston, London, and St. Thomas.

It was previously known as the Intercounty Major Baseball League and the Senior Intercounty Baseball League. Teams compete for the Jack and Lynne Dominico Trophy, which is awarded to the league champions. The trophy is named for the late owners of the  Toronto Maple Leafs baseball team, husband and wife Jack and Lynne Dominico

All-Star Game
On July 8, 2006, in Barrie, the league's New Era IBL All-Star Classic game between the Barrie Baycats and the IBL All-Stars; Barrie won 7–2.

On August 21 and 22, 2010 in Ottawa, the Fat Cats hosted the New Era All-Star Classic between the IBL All-Stars and the All-Stars from Ligue de Baseball Senior Élite du Québec (LBSEQ).

Barrie hosted the league's All-Star Game on July 11, 2015, with the IBL All-Stars defeating Barrie Baycats 13–4.

Teams

* Guelph and London finished regular season with identical 31-11 records so a one game tiebreaker was played to determine the regular season pennant winner

Source:

Past teams

Champions

The winning team is awarded the Jack and Lynne Dominico Cup.

Other awards presented include:

 Rawlings IBL Player of the Year Award/John Bell Memorial Trophy
 IBL Rookie of the Year/Brian Kerr Memorial Trophy

Notable players

John Axford (Brantford Red Sox) – Milwaukee Brewers, St. Louis Cardinals, Cleveland Indians, Pittsburgh Pirates, Colorado Rockies, Oakland Athletics, Los Angeles Dodgers, Toronto Blue Jays
Don Beaupre (Waterloo Tigers) – Minnesota North Stars
Todd Betts (Barrie Baycats) - Yakult Swallows
Tom Burgess (London Majors) - St. Louis Cardinals
Rich Butler (Toronto Maple Leafs) – Toronto Blue Jays, Tampa Bay Devil Rays
Rob Butler (Toronto Maple Leafs) – Toronto Blue Jays, Philadelphia Phillies
Frank Colman (London Majors) – Pittsburgh Pirates, New York Yankees
Scott Diamond (Guelph Royals) – Minnesota Twins, Toronto Blue Jays
Rob Ducey (Cambridge) Phillies, Toronto Blue Jays, California Angels, Texas Rangers, Nippon-Ham Fighters, Seattle Mariners, Philadelphia Phillies, Montreal Expos
Wilmer Fields (Brantford Red Sox) 1939–50 – Homestead Grays
Mike Gardiner (Stratford Hillers) Detroit Tigers, Boston Red Sox, Montreal Expos, Seattle Mariners 1990–1995
Ferguson Jenkins (London Majors) Philadelphia Phillies, Chicago Cubs, Texas Rangers, Boston Red Sox (1991 National Baseball Hall of Fame inductee)
Mike Kilkenny (London Majors) – Detroit Tigers
Joe Krakauskas (Brantford Red Sox) 1937–46 – Washington Senators & Cleveland Indians
Larry Landreth (Stratford Hillers) – Montreal Expos
Lester Lockett (Kitchener) – Baltimore Elite Giants
Roy McKay (London Majors) – Detroit Tigers
Denny McLain (London Majors) – Detroit Tigers, Washington Senators, Oakland Athletics, Atlanta Braves
Jesse Orosco (Galt Terriers) – New York Mets, Los Angeles Dodgers, Cleveland Indians, Milwaukee Brewers, Baltimore Orioles, St. Louis Cardinals, San Diego Padres, New York Yankees, Minnesota Twins
Pete Orr (Toronto Maple Leafs) – Atlanta Braves, Washington Nationals, Philadelphia Phillies
Lester B. Pearson (Guelph Maple Leafs) – Prime Minister of Canada (22 April 1963 – 20 April 1968)
Dalton Pompey (Guelph Royals) - Toronto Blue Jays
Goody Rosen (Galt Terriers) – Brooklyn Dodgers, New York Giants
Dave Rozema (London Majors) – Detroit Tigers
Chris Speier (Stratford) – San Francisco Giants, St. Louis Cardinals, Minnesota Twins, Chicago Cubs & Montreal Expos
Paul Spoljaric (Toronto Maple Leafs, Barrie Baycats) – Toronto Blue Jays, Seattle Mariners, Philadelphia Phillies, Kansas City Royals
Ron Stead (Brantford Red Sox) – 1967 Pan American Games
Fred Thomas (Kitchener Panthers) – Wilkes-Barre Barons, Cincinnati Crescents (basketball), Toronto Argonauts (CFL)
Rob Thomson (Stratford Hillers) – Detroit Tigers
Scott Thorman (Brantford Red Sox) – Atlanta Braves
Jimmy Wilkes (Brantford Red Sox) – Negro leagues: Newark Eagles, Houston Eagles, Indianapolis Clowns

 Player is an inductee of the Canadian Baseball Hall of Fame

Notable executives
Bob Ferguson, league statistician (1958 to 1966) and owner of the London Pontiacs (1963 to 1964)

References
 Intercounty Major Baseball League's 1998 Record Book by Editor Herb Morell and Dominico Promotions Inc.

External links
Intercounty Baseball League official website

 
Baseball in Ontario
Summer baseball leagues
Baseball leagues in Canada
1919 establishments in Ontario
Sports leagues established in 1919